Greg Beatty is a Rhysling Award winning author of poetry and prose, primarily in the science fiction and fantasy genres. He received his BA from the University of Washington and a PhD from the University of Iowa. He attended Clarion West, as it was then known, in 2000 and lives in Bellingham, Washington with his wife.

Bibliography

Poetry 
Collections
 

List of poems

References

External links

Greg Beatty's home page

American science fiction writers
University of Washington alumni
Living people
Rhysling Award for Best Short Poem winners
American male poets
American poets
American male novelists
Asimov's Science Fiction people
Year of birth missing (living people)